John Gregory Choma (born February 9, 1955) is a former American football offensive linemen who played three seasons with the San Francisco 49ers of the National Football League (NFL). He was drafted by the San Diego Chargers in the fifth round of the 1978 NFL Draft but later released. He played college football at the University of Virginia and attended Normandy High School in Parma, Ohio. He was a member of the San Francisco 49ers team that won Super Bowl XVI.

References

External links
Just Sports Stats
The Pro Football Archives
Fanbase profile

Living people
1955 births
Players of American football from Cleveland
American football offensive linemen
Virginia Cavaliers football players
San Diego Chargers players
San Francisco 49ers players